The 2018 Men's Oceania Handball Challenge Trophy is to be held at the L'Arene du Sud, New Caledonia between 10 and 15 June 2018.

This is the sixth ever championship. The competition participants were defending champions Tahiti, Australia, Cook Islands, New Zealand, hosts New Caledonia and Fiji.

Australia won their fourth title beating defending champions Tahiti. Hosts New Caledonia were third followed by New Zealand, Fiji and the Cook Islands.

Results

Rankings

References

 https://www.lnc.nc/article/sports/aux-oceania-les-cagous-aurontla-revanche-dans-la-peau La Nouvelles Calledoniennes (French)
 Faire le lien entre l’ancienne et la nouvelle génération La Nouvelles Calledoniennes (French)
 Les Calédoniens dominent les Papous aux Oceania. La Nouvelles Calledoniennes (French)
 U20 : les Tahitiens trop forts pour les Cagous. La Nouvelles Calledoniennes (French)
 2018 French Pacific Junior Men's Handball Cup
 Critical for the development of handball in our region. IHF webpage. 26 June 2018.
 Strong Hornsby contingent in Australian Youth team contesting for Oceania Challenge Trophy. Hornsby Advocate. June 12, 2018
 The Arc News. University of New South Wales web page. Retrieved 26 Dec 2019
 Post Courier Papua New Guinea. 12 June 2018.

Oceania Men's Handball Challenge Trophy